Upton is a hamlet in the civil parish of Caldbeck, in the Allerdale district, in the county of Cumbria, England.

Hamlets in Cumbria
Caldbeck